A milkshake (sometimes simply called a shake) is a sweet beverage made by blending milk, ice cream, and flavorings or sweeteners such as butterscotch, caramel sauce, chocolate syrup, fruit syrup, or whole fruit into a thick, sweet, cold mixture. It may also be made using a base made from non-dairy products, including plant milks such as almond milk, coconut milk, or soy milk.

Milkshakes originated in the United States around the turn of the 20th century, and grew in popularity following the introduction of electric blenders in the subsequent two decades. They became a common part of youth popular culture, as ice cream shops were a culturally acceptable meeting place for youth, and milkshakes became symbolic of the innocence of youth.

Preparation
Full-service restaurants, ice cream shops, soda fountains, and diners usually prepare the shake in a milkshake machine. At home, a blender is more commonly used. Milkshakes may be made from any flavor of ice cream; additional flavorings, such as chocolate syrup, malt syrup, or malted milk powder, are often added prior to mixing.

Many fast food outlets do not make shakes from the individual ingredients; rather, they use automatic milkshake machines which freeze and serve a pre-made milkshake mixture consisting of milk, a sweetened flavoring agent, and a thickening agent. These are similar to soft-serve ice cream machines, but keep the shake at a drinkable consistency.

Terminology
Terminology around the distinction between a milkshake that uses ice cream and other forms of flavored milk varies regionally. An ice cream-based milkshake may be called a thick shake to distinguish it. In parts of New England and eastern Canada, the name frappe is used. Rhode Island residents sometimes refer to milkshakes as "cabinets". A milkshake containing malted milk powder is sometimes called a malt. The term  concrete is used for particularly thick milkshakes that do not spill when turned upside down, such as at the restaurant Culver's.

History

1880s–1930s
When the term "milkshake" was first used in print in 1885, milkshakes were an alcoholic whiskey drink that has been described as a "sturdy, healthful eggnog type of drink, with eggs, whiskey, etc., served as a tonic as well as a treat". However, by 1900, the term referred to "wholesome drinks made with chocolate, strawberry, or vanilla syrups." By the "early 1900s people were asking for the new treat, often with ice cream." By the 1930s, milkshakes were a popular drink at malt shops, which were the "typical soda fountain of the period ... used by students as a meeting place or hangout."

The history of the electric blender, malted milk drinks, and milkshakes are interconnected. Before the widespread availability of electric blenders, milkshake-type drinks were more like eggnog, or they were a hand-shaken mixture of crushed ice and milk, sugar, and flavorings. Hamilton Beach introduced its Cyclone Drink Mixer in 1910, and it was widely used in soda fountains.

The Hamilton Beach design, with the motor on top, remains the most common kind of milkshake machine. In 1922, Steven Poplawski invented the bottom-motor blender, which is sometimes used for making milkshakes. With the invention of the blender, milkshakes began to take their modern, whipped, aerated, and frothy form.

The use of malted milk powder in milkshakes was popularized in the US by the Chicago drugstore chain Walgreens. Malted milk powder – a mixture of evaporated milk, malted barley, and wheat flour – was invented by William Horlick in 1897 for use as an easily digested restorative health drink for disabled people and children, and as an infant's food. However, healthy people soon began drinking beverages made with malted milk simply for the taste, and malted milk beverages containing milk, chocolate syrup, and malt powder became a standard offering at soda fountains. In 1922, Walgreens employee Ivar "Pop" Coulson made a milkshake by adding two scoops of vanilla ice cream to the standard malted milk drink recipe. This item, under the name "Horlick's Malted Milk", was featured by the Walgreen drugstore chain as part of a chocolate milkshake, which itself became known as a "malted" or "malt" and became one of the most popular soda-fountain drinks.

The automation of milkshakes developed in the 1930s, after the invention of freon-cooled refrigerators provided a safe, reliable way of automatically making and dispensing ice cream. In 1936, inventor Earl Prince used the basic concept behind the freon-cooled automated ice cream machine to develop the Multimixer, a "five-spindled mixer that could produce five milkshakes at once, all automatically, and dispense them at the pull of a lever into awaiting paper cups."

In the late 1930s, several newspaper articles show that the term "frosted" was used to refer to milkshakes made with ice cream. In 1937, the Denton Journal in Maryland stated that "For a 'frosted' shake, add a dash of your favorite ice cream." In 1939, the Mansfield News in Ohio stated that "A frosted beverage, in the vernacular, is something good to which ice cream has been added. Example par excellence is frosted coffee –that hot, tasty beverage made chilly with ice and frosty with ice cream."

1940s–1950s
By the 1950s, popular places to drink milkshakes were Woolworth's "5 & 10" lunch counters, diners, burger joints, and drugstore soda fountains. These establishments often prominently displayed a shining chrome or stainless steel milkshake mixing machine.

Soda fountain staff had their own jargon, such as "Burn One All the Way" (chocolate malted with chocolate ice cream), "Twist It, Choke It, and Make It Cackle" (chocolate malted with an egg), "Shake One in the Hay" (a strawberry shake), and a "White Cow" (a vanilla milkshake). In the 1950s, a milkshake machine salesman named Ray Kroc bought exclusive rights to the 1930s-era Multimixer milkshake maker from inventor Earl Prince, and went on to use automated milkshake machines to speed up production at McDonald's restaurants. 

Milkshakes had also become popular in other parts of the world, including the United Kingdom and Australia. In Australia, milk bars had grown popular and milkshakes were normally served lightly whipped and often in the aluminium or stainless steel cups in which they were prepared. In addition to more traditional flavors, spearmint and lime-flavored milkshakes became popular in Australia.

2000s–present

In 2006, the U.S. Agricultural Research Service developed reduced-sugar, low-fat milk shakes for lunch programs. The shakes have half the sugar and only 10% of the fat of commercial fast-food shakes. Schools need a milk shake machine or soft-serve ice cream machine to serve the milkshakes. The milkshakes also have added fiber and other nutrients, and they have much less lactose, which makes the shakes appropriate for some lactose-intolerant people.

The U.S. sales of milkshakes, malts, and floats rose 11% in 2006, according to the industry research firm NPD Group. Christopher Muller, the director of the Center for Multi-Unit Restaurant Management at Orlando's University of Central Florida said that "milkshakes remind us of summer, youth – and indulgence", and "they're evocative of a time gone by".
Muller stated that milkshakes are an "enormously profitable" item for restaurants, since the drinks contain so much air. The market research firm Technomic states that about 75% of the average-priced $3.38 restaurant shake in 2006 was profit. An executive from Sonic Drive-In, a U.S. chain of 1950s-style diner restaurants, calls shakes "one of our highest-volume, revenue-producing areas".

A 2016 article stated that chefs are trying out innovative ideas with milkshakes to keep customers interested in the drinks. The article noted that coffee-flavored shakes are popular "because it complements both sweet and savory" dishes. Another trend is using different types of milk, such as almond milk, coconut milk, or hemp milk.

Use in protests

In May 2019, during the build-up to the EU parliament elections in the United Kingdom, the throwing of milkshakes emerged as a protest tactic, usually targeting right-wing politicians. The movement originated with the "milkshaking" of Tommy Robinson, with a second thrown later that month.

The UK police requested that an Edinburgh McDonald's refrain from selling milkshakes on May 17 during a visit by Nigel Farage. This prompted Burger King to tweet in response: "We're selling milkshakes all weekend. Have fun." Burger King's tweet was later banned by the UK's Advertising Standards Authority, because they felt that it "condoned the previous anti-social behaviour and encouraged further instances", and that it was therefore an "irresponsible" advertisement. At a separate visit in Newcastle on May 20, Farage had a Five Guys milkshake thrown at him. Carl Benjamin had a total of four milkshakes thrown at him that week. The act of milkshaking is similar to that of egging as a form of protest against political figures.

In popular culture
 
Milkshakes in the movies have been described a "shorthand for sweetness and goodness". In All About Eve, by director Joseph L. Mankiewicz, Bette Davis’s character is unhappy to see a man she likes chatting up her young female assistant, so Davis's character orders an alcoholic Martini, and "then mockingly suggests [that] Eve [the young assistant] will have a milkshake", thereby "asserting womanhood over girlhood through milkshake's associations with virginity." Similarly, the socially awkward and nerdy character Steve Buscemi plays in Ghost World is made fun of by a teenage girl because he orders a "virginal vanilla milkshake"; in Manhattan, by director Woody Allen, the director draws attention to the difference in age between his 42-year-old character (he also acts in the lead role) and his teenage girlfriend by having her drink a milkshake. In the film Lolita in 1997, a teenage girl drinks a milkshake while she is with the middle-aged man (her mother's new boyfriend) who is attracted to her. 

The characters from Archie Comics are often depicted drinking milkshakes. The TV series Riverdale, inspired by the comics, depicts the characters in a 1950s-inspired local diner, Pop's Chock'lit Shoppe; to promote the show, the cast shared a milkshake during an appearance on The Tonight Show starring Jimmy Fallon.

Master Shake, one of the main characters from the American animated series Aqua Teen Hunger Force (also known by various alternative titles), is a life-sized anthropomorphic milkshake.

The term "milkshake duck" refers to the social media trend where "the internet rushes en masse to embrace something or someone as cute, worthy, fun or funny" (such as a duck that drinks milkshakes), but "then just as quickly drops it when it's revealed to somehow be unpleasantly complicated"; the paper called the term "useful shorthand" for when a "favourite [concept] is revealed to be problematic".

In Australia in April 2021, the federal government led by Prime Minister Scott Morrison released a video intended to teach high-school students about sexual consent; it featured a young woman drinking a milkshake and smearing the drink over her male companion's face after he declined to drink it voluntarily. The "milkshake metaphor" was widely criticised by sexual assault experts and was later removed from government websites.

See also

 Health shake
 Keventers Milkshake – an Indian milkshake brand
 Smoothie

References

External links

American drinks
Cold drinks
Shake
Ice cream drinks
Milk-based drinks
Non-alcoholic drinks